Bid Mehr (also Romanized as Bīd Mehr and Bīdmehr) is a village in Fathabad Rural District, in the Central District of Baft County, Kerman Province, Iran. At the 2006 census, its population was 17, in 5 families.

References 

Populated places in Baft County